Roy Koerner MBE was a Polar explorer who participated in the 1968-1969 surface crossing of the Arctic Ocean with expedition leader Sir Wally Herbert. The then Prime Minister, Harold Wilson described the journey as "a feat of endurance and courage which ranks with any in polar history", and Prince Philip felt "ranks among the greatest triumphs of human skill and endurance".

Early life and career
Koerner was born on 3 July 1932 in Copnor, Portsmouth. From an early age, he was nicknamed "Fritz" on account of his Germanic surname, and the moniker stuck. He was educated at Sheffield University, after which he taught at Bridgemary Community School before joining the British Antarctic Survey in 1957.

Polar career
From 1968 to 1969 he was a member of the British Trans-Arctic Expedition led by Wally Herbert, a  surface crossing of the Arctic Ocean, from Alaska to Spitsbergen. In the 1970s Koerner emigrated to Canada where he spent more than forty years studying the history embedded in glacial ice. He was head of the Ice Core Laboratory at Ottawa. Koerner died after being sent home from his final mission on 26 May 2008.

Tributes
Koerner has a 600-metre high rock named after him on Deception Island in the British Antarctic Territory.

References

1932 births
People from Portsmouth
Alumni of the University of Sheffield
Explorers of Antarctica
Explorers of the Arctic
British glaciologists
Recipients of the Polar Medal
Members of the Order of the British Empire
English explorers
English expatriates in Canada
2008 deaths